Lake Pat Cleburne is the municipal water reservoir for the city of Cleburne, Texas, as well as a recreational lake for residents.  It is formed by damming the Nolan River which continues below the lake's dam.  The water is murky due to sediment. U.S. Highway 67 crosses over the extreme north end of the lake lending a panoramic view of the complete lake.

History
Lake Pat Cleburne is owned and operated by the City of Cleburne.  It was built as the city's water supply and was impounded in 1961.  Originally named the Cleburne Reservoir it was later renamed for the Confederate general Patrick Cleburne.

Johnson County's first county seat of Wardville was at the present location of the lake.

Fish populations

 Largemouth bass
 Channel catfish
 Flathead catfish
 Blue catfish
 White crappie
 White bass

The lake is stocked with bass and catfish infrequently.

Recreational uses

 Boating
 Water skiing
 Fishing
 Swimming

Recreational areas
Parking, walk up access, and boat ramps are available on the east and west sides of the lake.

There is a park area on the east bank of the river accessible by FM 1718 (Country Club Road).
On the west bank, access is via FM 1434.

Cleburne State Park is approximately 10 miles (16 km) away from Lake Pat Cleburne.

External links
 Lake Pat Cleburne - Texas Parks and Wildlife
 

Reservoirs in Texas
Protected areas of Johnson County, Texas
Bodies of water of Johnson County, Texas
Cleburne, Texas